XL is a J-Pop group with three members - Onishi Terukado (guitar and vocals), Tokunaga Akito (programming and songwriting), and noriaki (drums).  The band made its debut on 29 April 1998 with the eponymous album XL.

Discography

Singles
 O-K! (29 July 1998)

Albums
 XL (29 April 1998)

External links
 XL - Official website

Japanese pop music groups